Alejandro Andrés Contreras Daza (born 3 March 1993 in Santiago, Chile) is a Chilean footballer who plays as a defender for Primera B de Chile club Deportes Temuco.

Club career
Contreras began his career playing for the Palestino youth team and was part of the squad that won the 2012 U-20 national championship. He made his debut in the Chilean Primera División on 31 March 2013 scoring against Deportes Antofagasta.

International career
Contreras was selected to play for the Chile national under-20 football team in the 2013 South American Youth Championship by team manager Mario Salas. Success in this tournament took Contreras and the team to the 2013 FIFA U-20 World Cup.

References

External links
 
 
 Soccer Punter profile

1993 births
Living people
Chilean footballers
Club Deportivo Palestino footballers
Universidad de Chile footballers
O'Higgins F.C. footballers
Chilean Primera División players
Chile under-20 international footballers
Association football defenders